Hung Shih-chieh (born 31 August 1986) is a Taiwanese badminton player. Hung who attended Kaohsiung High School, was part of the national junior team that won the bronze medal at the 2004 Asian Junior Championships in the girls' team event. Hung later educated at the Taipei Municipal Institute of Physical Education became the runner-up at the 2007 and 2008 National College Sports Games in the women's singles event. At the international senior level, she was the women's doubles champion at the 2008 U.S. Open, and the semi-finalists in the women's singles event. She represented Chinese Taipei at the 2010 Asian Games.

Achievements

BWF Grand Prix 
The BWF Grand Prix has two level such as Grand Prix and Grand Prix Gold. It is a series of badminton tournaments, sanctioned by Badminton World Federation (BWF) since 2007.

Women's doubles

 BWF Grand Prix Gold tournament
 BWF Grand Prix tournament

References

External links
 

1986 births
Living people
Taiwanese female badminton players
Badminton players at the 2010 Asian Games
Asian Games competitors for Chinese Taipei
21st-century Taiwanese women